Saždevo is a village in the municipality of Kruševo, North Macedonia.

Demographics
Saždevo has traditionally and exclusively been populated by Muslim Albanians.

In statistics gathered by Vasil Kanchov in 1900, the village of Saždevo was inhabited by 130 Muslim Albanians. 

According to the 2021 census, the village had a total of 476 inhabitants. Ethnic groups in the village include:
Albanians 222
Turks 221 
Bosniaks 6
Others 27

References

External links

Villages in Kruševo Municipality
Albanian communities in North Macedonia